Tsinstikeptum 10, usually referred to as Tsinstikeptum Indian Reserve No. 10, is one of two Indian Reserves of the Westbank First Nation located in West Kelowna, British Columbia, Canada.  It and Tsinstikeptum Indian Reserve No. 9 are jointly normally referred to as the Westbank Indian Reserve.  Tsinstikeptum Indian Reserve No. 10, which is 339 ha. in area, is located opposite the City of Kelowna proper, across Okanagan Lake.

Demographics 
As a census subdivision in the Canada 2011 Census, Tsinstikeptum 10 had a population of 1,186, of which the majority were non-aboriginal residents. The total registered population of the Westbank First Nation among all five of its reserves, including off-reserve members, is only 784.

See also 
List of Indian reserves in British Columbia
Tsinstikeptum Indian Reserve No. 9

External links 
Map of Tsinstikeptum 10 at Statistics Canada

References 

Indian reserves in British Columbia
Populated places in the Regional District of Central Okanagan
Syilx